Janzé is a town in Brittany, France. It is also the name of
Alice de Janzé, British socialite
Frédéric de Janzé, French racing driver